The Devil Bat is a 1940 black-and-white American horror/howcatchem film produced by Producers Releasing Corporation (PRC) and directed by Jean Yarborough. The film stars Bela Lugosi along with Suzanne Kaaren, Guy Usher, Yolande Mallott and the comic team of Dave O'Brien and Donald Kerr as the protagonists. It was the first horror film from PRC.

Plot

Foreword

Dr. Paul Carruthers (Bela Lugosi), a chemist and physician in the small town of Heathville, is offered a $5,000 bonus from his employers for his contributions to the company, a pittance compared to the million dollars in income the company earned from his work. (His employers argue that he took a buyout early in the company's history instead of retaining his partnership stake.) Embittered and insulted, he seeks revenge and develops a system in which ordinary bats are enlarged to massive size, training them to be drawn to a new, pungent aftershave he is testing. He cleverly distributes the lotion to his enemies as a "test" product.

Once they have applied the lotion, the chemist then releases his Devil Bats in the night, targeting the families of his employer's owners. The bats succeed in attacking and killing one of the owners and two of his sons. A hot shot reporter from the Chicago Register, Johnny Layton (Dave O'Brien) gets assigned by his editor (Arthur Q. Bryan) to cover and help solve the murders. He and his bumbling photographer "One-Shot" McGuire (Donald Kerr) begin to unwind the mystery with some comic sidelights.

In the climactic closing scene, Layton dumps a sample of the aftershave on Carruthers, leading the bat to attack and kill its own master. Mary, the last surviving member of her family, runs into Johnny's arms.

Cast

 Bela Lugosi as Dr. Paul Carruthers
 Suzanne Kaaren as Mary Heath
 Dave O'Brien as Johnny Layton
 Guy Usher as Henry Morton
 Yolande Mallott as Maxine
 Donald Kerr as "One-Shot" McGuire
 Edward Mortimer as Martin Heath
 Gene O'Donnell as Don Morton
 Alan Baldwin as Tommy Heath
 John Ellis as Roy Heath
 Arthur Q. Bryan as Joe McGinty
 Hal Price as Chief Wilkins
 John Davidson as Prof. Raines
 Billy Griffith as Coroner
 Wally Rairdon as Walter King

Production
PRC was a young studio when it planned to enter the horror film genre, which had been neglected by the major studios during 1937 and 1938. Lugosi was beginning a comeback when he signed a contract on October 19, 1940, with PRC's Sigmund Neufeld to star in the Poverty Row studio's first horror film.

The shooting of the film began a little more than one week later. PRC was known for shooting its films quickly and cheaply, but for endowing them with a plentiful amount of horror, and The Devil Bat established this modus operandi.

Current status
Following its theatrical release, The Devil Bat fell into public domain and since the advent of home video, has been released in countless truncated, poorly edited video and DVD editions.

In 1990, the film was restored from original 35mm elements by Bob Furmanek and released on laserdisc by Lumivision. In 2008, Furmanek supplied his original elements to Legend Films, which performed a new restoration and also created a computer-colorized version. Both the restored black-and-white and colorized versions were subsequently released on DVD.

In 2013, The Devil Bat was released on Blu-ray by Kino Lorber under its Kino Classics label.

Reception
The film was re-released in 1945 on a double bill with Man Made Monster. The Los Angeles Times described the duo as "two of the scariest features on the market."

In the book Poverty Row Horrors! (1993), Tom Weaver judges The Devil Bat as one of Lugosi's best films for the poverty row studios.

Sequels
PRC's 1946 film Devil Bat's Daughter starred Rosemary LaPlanche as Paul Carruthers's daughter. Neither Lugosi nor any other actors reprise their roles; Carruthers is an unseen character in the latter film. In contrast to the horror elements of the original, Devil Bat's Daughter was mainly a psychological thriller.

In 2015 Indie filmmaker Ted Moehring directed the sequel Revenge of the Devil Bat, which stars Lynn Lowry, Ruby Larocca and veteran actors Gary Kent, John Link, Dick Dyszel, George Stover and Conrad Brooks.

See also
 Bela Lugosi filmography

References

Further reading
 Weaver, Tom (1993). "The Devil Bat (PRC, 1940)" in Poverty Row Horrors! Monogram, PRC and Republic Horror Films of the Forties. Jefferson, North Carolina: McFarland & Co. . pp. 14–25.

External links 

 
 
 
 
 
 Review of film at You Call Yourself a Scientist
 The Devil Bats, a band influenced by the movie and Rock N Roll!
 IMDB link to Devil Bat's Daughter, a sequel of sorts

1940 horror films
1940 films
1940s science fiction horror films
American black-and-white films
American science fiction horror films
Articles containing video clips
Films directed by Jean Yarbrough
Producers Releasing Corporation films
American films about revenge
Mad scientist films
American monster movies
American natural horror films
Films about bats
1940s English-language films
American exploitation films
1940s American films